Costa Fortuna is a cruise ship for Costa Crociere built in 2003 on the same platform as Carnival Cruise Lines' . She was inspired by the Italian steamships of the past. Models of these ships are on display in the ship's public areas. In the atrium, models of the 26 past and present ships of Costa's fleet are displayed upside down, on the ceiling, up to, and including, Costa Fortuna herself. She was refurbished between 10 and 16 December 2018 in Singapore and was re-positioned back to Genoa, Italy in March 2019.

Design and description

The vessel was built along the same lines as Carnival Cruise Lines' . The aft decks are tiered and have limited open deck space.

The ship is powered by a diesel-electric propulsion system creating  servicing two azimuth thrusters. The vessel has a crew of 1,090. Costa Fortuna has capacity for 2,702 passengers at dual occupancy and 3,470 passengers maximum. There are four restaurants and eleven bars and lounges. The interior decor is Art Deco.

Construction and career

The ship was constructed by Fincantieri in Italy with a build date of 31 October 2003. Named Costa Fortuna for the daughter of the mythological god of the sea Poseidon, the cruise ship entered service on 17 November 2003. The vessel is owned and operated by Costa Crociere and registered in Genoa, Italy.

In December 2018, the cruise ship underwent an €8 million, six-day refit in Singapore. Prior to the refit, the vessel was based in China. Following the refit, Costa Fortuna was to operate out of Genoa. For the 2020/2021 season, Costa Fortuna sailed the Mediterranean Sea, with stops in Turkey, Greece and Spain.

Costa Fortuna attempted to dock at Phuket, Thailand on 6 March 2020, but was denied by Thai officials because it was carrying passengers who had left Italy within the last two weeks due to coronavirus fears. On 7 March, the ship attempted to dock at Penang in northern Malaysia, but was denied due to a complete ban on cruise ships. The ship returned to Singapore on 10 March 2020 and all passengers were found well and were allowed to disembark.

Notes

Citations

References

External links 
 
 

 

Ships of Costa Cruises
2003 ships
Ships built by Fincantieri